Otto Bökle (17 February 1912 – 16 August 1988) was a German international footballer.

References

1912 births
1988 deaths
Association football forwards
German footballers
Germany international footballers
VfB Stuttgart players